Villers-Campeau is a former commune in the Nord department in northern France, absorbed in 1947 into Somain.

Heraldry

See also
Communes of the Nord department

Former communes of Nord (French department)